Abdank is a Polish coat of arms. It was used by several szlachta families in the times of the Kingdom of Poland and the Polish–Lithuanian Commonwealth.

Blazoning
Gules łękawica  argent, crest: łąkawica as in arms.

History

According to Kasper Niesiecki the beginning of this shield dates from the time of Krakus, a mythological Polish monarch who founded and gave his name to the city of Kraków. On Wawel Mount, where Kraków's castle stood, from the Wisła (Vistula) river side, a man-eating dragon showed up. One day a man called Skuba, a young shoemaker, took the skin of a flayed sheep, put tar and sulphur and fire-brand into it and threw it into the dragon's lair. The dragon, not recognizing the deception, assumed it was a sacrifice from the people of Kraków and ate the fake sheep. The fire in his belly ignited it and as a result the dragon became very thirsty. He drank and drank the water from the Wisła river until he finally exploded and died. For his heroic deed Krakus granted Skuba the letter "W" to his shield, standing either for wąż (snake) or for Wawel. This letter can be seen on the Abdank coat of arms.
The Awdaniec Clan (such as it may be) has been called variously: "Awdaniec," "Abdaniec," "Abdanka," "Awdanc," "Awdanczyc," "Habdaniec," "Habdank," "Habdaniec," "Hebdank," "Lakotka," "Lekawa," "Lekawica," "Lekotka," "Bialkotka," "Szczedrzyk," "Skuba," and probably other things similar and dissimilar. Known recorded war cries are: "Abdaniec!," "Abdank!,""Awdaniec!," "Habdank!," and "Hebdank!."

Abdank in literature 
In Henryk Sienkiewicz's "With Fire and Sword" the Cossack leader Bohdan Khmelnytsky, wishing to hide his true identity, falsely introduces himself to the main protagonist Skrzetuski as "Zenobi Abdank, Abdank Coat of Arms, Abdank with a cross, a nobleman of Kiev county".

Notable bearers
Notable bearers of this Coat of Arms include:

Józef Ankwicz, Deputy to the Great Sejm
Andrzej Alojzy Ankwicz, Roman Catholic archbishop of Prague
Skarbmir count palatine of Poland
Bernard Zdzisław Skarbek, Count, Colonel 3rd Carpathian Rifle Division (Poland)  WWII Battles : Battle of Monte Cassino, Battle of Ancona, Battle of Bologna
Martynas Goštautas
Jonas Goštautas
Albrecht Goštautas
Stanislovas Goštautas
Marian Toczyński
Jerzy Jazłowiecki
Bohdan Khmelnytsky, leader of the Khmelnytsky Uprising
Jan Konarski, Bishop of Kraków
Alfred Korzybski, linguist
Jan Kozietulski, commander of the Polish cavalry charge at the Battle of Somosierra
Ignacy Skarbek-Kruszewski, Polish and Belgian general
Boguslaw Kruszewski, sailor
Mikołaj Kruszewski
Miroslawa Kruszewska, writer, poetess
Konrad Johann Kruszewski, artist, graphic designer
Mieszko Boguslaw Kruszewski, translator, writer
Tomasz Włodzimierz Kruszewski, veteran
Kazimierz Rudzki
Wilfrid Voynich - born Michał Habdank-Wojnicz
Ivan Vyhovsky, Ataman of the Ukrainian Cossacks
Christine Granville - born Krystyna Skarbek
Michał Haraburda

See also
 Polish heraldry
 Heraldic family
 List of Polish nobility coats of arms

Related coat of arms
 Syrokomla coat of arms

Bibliography
 Bartosz Paprocki: Herby rycerstwa polskiego na pięcioro ksiąg rozdzielone, Kraków, 1584.
 Tadeusz Gajl: Herbarz polski od średniowiecza do XX wieku : ponad 4500 herbów szlacheckich 37 tysięcy nazwisk 55 tysięcy rodów. L&L, 2007. .

Notes

External links

 Bartosz Paprocki on Abdank
 Kasper Niesiecki on Abdank

Polish coats of arms